Krans is a surname. Notable people with the surname include:

Horatio Sheafe Krans (1872–1952), American author and editor
Olof Krans (1838–1916), Swedish-American folk artist